Dunith Wellalage (born 9 January 2003) is a Sri Lankan cricketer. He made his international debut for the Sri Lanka cricket team in June 2022. He has his education at St. Sebastian's College, Moratuwa and St. Joseph's College, Colombo.

Career
He made his List A debut on 14 December 2019, for Lankan Cricket Club in the 2019–20 Invitation Limited Over Tournament.

In January 2022, he was named as the captain of Sri Lanka's team for the 2022 ICC Under-19 Cricket World Cup in the West Indies. In Sri Lanka's opening fixture of the tournament, he took a five-wicket haul, and was named the player of the match. In Sri Lanka's next match of the tournament, he took another five-wicket haul, and was again named the player of the match. In Sri Lanka's Super League playoff semi-final match against South Africa, Wellalage scored 113 runs, with Sri Lanka winning the match by 65 runs. He became the first captain of the Sri Lankan team to score a century in the Under-19 Cricket World Cup. He finished the Under-19 World Cup as the leading wicket-taker, with seventeen dismissals.

In April 2022, Sri Lanka Cricket (SLC) named him in the Sri Lanka Emerging Team's squad for their tour to England. On 25 May 2022, during the tour of England, he made his Twenty20 debut, against Surrey. The following month, he was named in the Sri Lanka A squad for their matches against Australia A during Australia's tour of Sri Lanka. Later the same month, he was named in Sri Lanka's One Day International (ODI) squad, also for their series against Australia. He made his ODI debut on 14 June 2022, for Sri Lanka against Australia. The following month, he was added to Sri Lanka's Test squad for the second match against Australia.

In July 2022, he was signed by the Jaffna Kings for the third edition of the Lanka Premier League. Also in July, he was again named in Sri Lanka's Test squad, this time for their home series against Pakistan. He made his Test debut on 24 July 2022, for Sri Lanka against Pakistan.

References

External links
 

2003 births
Living people
Sri Lankan cricketers
Sri Lanka Test cricketers
Sri Lanka One Day International cricketers
Lankan Cricket Club cricketers
Place of birth missing (living people)